is a male triple jumper from Japan. His personal best jump is 16.65 metres, achieved in October 2003 in Hyderabad.

International competitions

References

1967 births
Living people
Japanese male triple jumpers
Asian Games silver medalists for Japan
Asian Games bronze medalists for Japan
Asian Games medalists in athletics (track and field)
Athletes (track and field) at the 1994 Asian Games
Athletes (track and field) at the 2002 Asian Games
Medalists at the 1994 Asian Games
Medalists at the 2002 Asian Games
Japan Championships in Athletics winners